Lindsey Snell is an American journalist covering conflict and crises in the Caucasus, Middle East and North Africa.

Background 
Snell produced videos and documentaries used by ABC News, MSNBC, Vice, Discovery Digital Networks, VICE on HBO and Ozy, her print work has appeared in Foreign Policy, The Daily Beast, North Press Agency, and The Investigative Journal.

In 2011, Snell produced the feature-length documentary, Square Grouper: The Godfathers of Ganja, which premiered at the 2011 SXSW festival.

Snell was an associate producer on the feature-length documentaries Cocaine Cowboys: Reloaded, Limelight which premiered at the 2011 Tribeca Film Festival.

She served as a researcher on short films documentaries 30 for 30 aired by ESPN such as The U (2009), Broke (2012) and Collision Course: The Murder of Don Aronow (2013).

Doxxing by Turkish ultra-nationalists 
In June 2021, just before her birthday Snell received unsettling twitter messages by a twitter account referencing the Turkish ultra-nationalist Grey Wolves organisation. They had obtained her date of birth and old home addresses. After reporting this to Twitter the messages were removed. However, other Pro-AKP accounts later continued to circulate it.

Kidnapping in Syria and imprisoned in Turkey 
In July 2016, while working, Snell was kidnapped by Jabhat al-Nusra, al-Qaeda's former affiliate in Aleppo, Syria. She escaped from the group after more than 2 weeks in captivity. After crossing the border from Syria to Turkey, she was arrested by Turkish authorities on August 6, and imprisoned for 67 days at Iskenderun and Hatay high security prisons, during which time Turkish media accused her of being a CIA agent and charged her with violating a military zone. Snell was released in October 2016. In 2018, while traveling to Baghdad, Iraq, Turkey attempted unsuccessfully to have Snell arrested via an Interpol diffusion notice.

Turkish 2020 intervention in Nagorno-Karabakh 

On September 22, 2020, 5 days before 2020 Nagorno-Karabakh war, Snell posted on her Twitter account that Turkish-backed Syrian National Army mercenaries from the Hamza Division were being sent to Baku via Turkey, to support Azerbaijani forces fight for Nagorno-Karabakh.

Awards 
A piece Snell produced for Vocativ about a girls' school in besieged Aleppo, Syria won an Edward R. Murrow Award in the Hard News category in 2016. ''

References

External links 
 
 Ishgal

Living people
People from Daytona Beach, Florida
Kidnapped American people
Kidnapping in Syria
American filmmakers
Year of birth missing (living people)